The Progressive Conservative Party of New Brunswick held a  leadership election on October 22, 2016, as a result of the resignation of David Alward on September 23, 2014, following his government's defeat in the 2014 provincial election. The Conservatives last had a leadership election in 2008.

Process
All members who have paid the $40 membership fee were eligible to vote on October 22 at the Aitken Centre or at one of several satellite locations around the province. The election used a one member, one vote process. Balloting continued until one candidate received 50% + 1 of ballots cast. A maximum of four candidates were allowed to proceed to the second ballot. As there was no victor on the second ballot, the lowest placed candidate was dropped from the third and subsequent ballots until one candidate received the required level of support.

Results
Round 1

(Dubé eliminated, endorses Higgs; Macdonald and Stewart eliminated, endorse Barley)
Round 2

(Allen eliminated, endorses Higgs; Barley eliminated, endorses Norton)
Round 3

Timeline
September 22, 2014 - Provincial election results in the defeat of Premier David Alward's  Progressive Conservative government after a single term.
September 23, 2014 - Alward announces his resignation as party leader.
October 18, 2014 - Bruce Fitch is chosen by the party caucus to serve as interim leader.
January 21, 2016 - Brian Macdonald announces his candidacy for leader.
January 30, 2016 - Party executive meets and sets October 22, 2016 as the date for the leadership convention and announces that the convention will be held at the Aitken Centre in Fredericton. 
March 17, 2016 - Blaine Higgs announces his candidacy for leader.
April 15, 2016 - Monica Barley announces her candidacy for leader. 
April 21, 2016 - Mike Allen announces his candidacy for leader.
May 4, 2016 - Mel Norton announces his candidacy for leader.
May 26, 2016 - Jake Stewart, MLA for Southwest Miramichi-Bay du Vin announces his candidacy for leader. 
July 27, 2016 - Jean F. Dubé announces his candidacy for leader.
August 26, 2016 - Due to the large number of candidates the party executive modifies the rules so that only a maximum of four candidates will be permitted to proceed to the second ballot, if one is required. 
October 22, 2016 - Leadership convention is held, Blaine Higgs is elected leader after three ballots.

Declared candidates

Brian Macdonald - MLA for Fredericton West-Hanwell
Candidacy declared: January 21, 2016.
Endorsements: Peter MacKay, Noël Kinsella, Jody Carr, Jeff Carr, Jack Carr, Carl Urquhart
Blaine Higgs - MLA for Quispamsis (2010–present), Minister of Finance (2010–2014)
Candidacy declared: March 17, 2016.
Endorsements: Bill Oliver, Sherry Wilson, Brian Keirstead, Rob Moore, Ernie Steeves

 Monica Barley -  Moncton lawyer
Candidacy declared: April 15, 2016.
Endorsements: Claude Williams, Ted Flemming

Mike Allen - MP for Tobique—Mactaquac (2006–2015)
Candidacy declared: April 21, 2016.
Endorsements: Kirk MacDonald, Richard Bragdon

Mel Norton - Mayor of Saint John, New Brunswick (2012–2016)
Candidacy declared: May 4, 2016.
Endorsements: Gary Crossman, Dorothy Shephard, Trevor Holder, Glen Savoie, Ross Wetmore, Rodney Weston.

Jake Stewart, MLA for Southwest Miramichi-Bay du Vin (2010–present)
Candidacy declared: May 26, 2016.
Endorsements: Jim Parrott

Jean Dubé, MLA for Campbellton (2001–2003), MP for Madawaska—Restigouche (1997–2000)
Candidacy declared: June 27, 2016.

Declined
Madeleine Dubé, MLA for Edmundston-Saint Basile, former Health Minister, Education Minister, and Social Development Minister
Ted Flemming, MLA for Rothesay, former Health Minister (2012–2014)

Notes

Progressive Conservative Party of New Brunswick leadership elections
2016 elections in Canada
2016 in New Brunswick
Progressive Conservative Party of New Brunswick leadership election